Schreurs is a Dutch occupational surname. It is derived via Schreuder from early Middle Dutch scrodere, which either was a tailor or a porter (carrier) (dock-worker, barrow-man). People with this surname include:

Cesar Roel Schreurs (born 1941), Mexican rock and roll singer
Danny Schreurs (born 1987), Dutch footballer
Eric Schreurs (born 1958), Dutch cartoonist
Geerike Schreurs (born 1989), Dutch road cyclist
Hamish Schreurs (born 1994), New Zealand road cyclist
Harry Schreurs (1901–1973), Dutch footballer
Jaap Schreurs (1913–1983), Dutch painter and graphic artist 
 (born 1985), Dutch road cyclist
Threes Schreurs (born 1959), Dutch novelist, theatre and film maker

References

Dutch-language surnames